Tennessee Civil War National Heritage Area is a federally designated National Heritage Area that encompasses the entire U.S. state of Tennessee. The heritage area concentrates on eight major corridors: the Mississippi River, Cumberland River, Tennessee River, Louisville and Nashville Railroad, Nashville and Chattanooga Railroad, East Tennessee Georgia and Virginia Railroad, Memphis and Charleston Railroad and the Nashville and Northwestern Railroad corridors.  

The Tennessee Civil War National Heritage Area was designated in 1996. It is managed by the Middle Tennessee State University Center for Historic Preservation.

References

External links
 Tennessee Civil War National Heritage Area official website

Protected areas of Tennessee
National Heritage Areas of the United States
Military history of Tennessee
Tennessee in the American Civil War
1996 establishments in Tennessee
Protected areas established in 1996
Middle Tennessee State University